Fathers and Daughters is a 2015 U.S.-Italian drama film directed by Gabriele Muccino and starring Russell Crowe, Amanda Seyfried, and Kylie Rogers. It is based on a 2012 script written by Brad Desch, which was included in the 2012 Black List survey. The film received mostly negative reviews from critics. It grossed over $5.1 million against a $22.4 million production budget.

Plot

Jake Davis is a Pulitzer Prize-winning novelist with a wife and daughter whom he loves dearly. However, while they're driving home from a party he argues with his wife over his flirting with a woman (he had cheated on her in the past, causing suspicion). This distracts him, causing their car's collision with a truck. Jake is injured badly, while his wife dies. His injury leaves him with brain damage, causing him seizures. A doctor warns him he needs treatment, since otherwise this might result in psychotic episodes. Jake reluctantly agrees, going to a hospital for treatment for seven months while his daughter Katie stays with her aunt Elizabeth and uncle William.

Upon his return, Elizabeth and William (who've become quite close with Katie over her stay with them), propose to adopt her, an idea Jake flatly rejects. He struggles to cope as a single father however, with his seizures returning (a fact he hides). Due to his brain damage Jake's writing suffers, resulting in his next book being panned by critics, with his own publishing company choosing not to market it widely. Due to his difficulties, Elizabeth and William sue him for custody, which Jake fears they can win. He writes an entire book with a burst of inspiration, angering Katie in the process by neglecting her. The lawsuit against him is dropped when William is revealed to have impregnated his secretary and Elizabeth files for divorce. Sadly however after his last book Fathers and Daughters, Jake's seizures result in his accidental death due to a head injury when he falls in the bathroom. His final book wins him a posthumous Pulitzer.

25 years later, Katie attends college and is studying psychology. It's shown that she's quite promiscuous, taking a guy she's just met into the bathroom and having sex with him. She rebuffs any more intimate relationship. Katie is shown to become a social worker, and connects with a girl named Lucy who, like her, has lost her mother, refusing to speak since her death. She continues her pattern of one-night stands before meeting Cameron, a man who has idolized her father's work, and they begin a relationship. With her help, Lucy improves greatly to the point that she's adopted, though Katie is hurt by hearing that they'll have no further contact. Though she grows closer to Cameron, Katie is still dealing with intimacy issues such as being afraid of losing him. She cheats on him, and Cameron angrily breaks up with her after learning this. Katie goes to his apartment, declaring her love for him, but she runs away after seeing he's with another woman. When she returns home in dejection though, Cameron is there waiting; they embrace and kiss.

The film is told in alternating segments between the past with Katie as a child with Jake and as a young adult in relationship with others.

Cast

 Russell Crowe as Jake Davis
 Amanda Seyfried as Katie Davis
 Kylie Rogers as Young Katie Davis
 Aaron Paul as Cameron
 Diane Kruger as Elizabeth
 Quvenzhané Wallis as Lucy Carter
 Janet McTeer as Carolyn
 Octavia Spencer as Dr. Korman
 Jane Fonda as Teddy Stanton
 Bruce Greenwood as William
 Michelle Veintimilla as Woman at Cameron's Apartment
 Ryan Eggold as John
 Paula Marshall as Laura Garner

Production

Development
Gabriele Muccino was hired to direct during the 2013 Cannes Film Festival. Russell Crowe was the first cast in October, with Amanda Seyfried joining the same month as Crowe's daughter. Kylie Rogers joining as the younger version of Crowe's daughter.

Casting
In November, Aaron Paul was cast in the film as Seyfried's love interest. Actresses Diane Kruger, Octavia Spencer, and Quvenzhané Wallis were cast in the film during the Berlin Film Festival. The same month, Janet McTeer was cast. In April 2014, it was announced Jane Fonda, and Bruce Greenwood had joined the cast of the film.

Filming
Crew members scouted Pittsburgh, Pennsylvania, as a filming location, with production slated for an April start date. Principal photography officially began on March 14 in Pittsburgh.

Music
Michael Bolton sings and wrote the song to this movie.

On May 25, 2014, James Horner was originally hired to compose the music for the film, but on September 26, Paolo Buonvino replaced Horner to score the film.

Release
The film was released first in Italy on October 1, 2015. It was then released in the United Kingdom on November 13, 2015, by Warner Bros.
Vertical Entertainment distributed the film in the U.S on July 8, 2016.

Critical response
The film received negative reviews from critics. Review aggregator Rotten Tomatoes reports a rating of 28% based on 50 reviews, with an average rating of 4.24/10; the site's consensus states: "Fathers and Daughters name-brand cast can't cover for a screenplay that makes a half-hearted effort at delving into family dynamics but falls back on melodrama." On Metacritic, the film has a score of 31% from 17 critics, indicating "generally unfavorable reviews".

References

External links
 
 
 
 
 
  (rating 1.5/5)

2015 films
2015 drama films
English-language Italian films
American drama films
Italian drama films
Films about depression
Films about writers
Films shot in Pittsburgh
Films directed by Gabriele Muccino
Voltage Pictures films
Vertical Entertainment films
Post-traumatic stress disorder in fiction
Films about father–daughter relationships
Films about parenting
2010s English-language films
2010s American films